Nathalie Tocci is an Italian political scientist and international relations expert. She specializes in the role of the European Union in international affairs and peacekeeping, and the relationship between European states. She has served as the Director of the Istituto Affari Internazionali, and has also worked as an advisor to the government of Italy and to EU officials on foreign policy issues.

Early life and education
Tocci studied politics, philosophy, and economics at University College, Oxford, graduating with a BA degree in 1998. In 1999 she obtained an MSc degree from the London School of Economics, with a dissertation in Development Studies that focused on the political economy of Turkey. In 2003, Tocci completed a PhD in International Relations at the London School of Economics. Her dissertation was called EU Accession Dynamics and Conflict Resolution: The Case of Cyprus 1988-2002.

Career
From 1999 to 2003, Tocci worked as a research fellow on EU relations at the Centre for European Policy Studies in Brussels. The following year she became a Jean Monnet Fellow at the Robert Schuman Centre for Advanced Studies in the European University Institute, where she continued to work until 2007. In 2006 she became a Senior Fellow at the Istituto Affari Internazionali, and in 2007 she returned for 2 years to the Centre for European Policy Studies. In 2010 Tocci became a Department Head at the Istituto Affari Internazionali, in 2011 she became Deputy Director there, and in 2017 she became the Director. She also served as the Associate Editor of the journal The International Spectator.

In 2014, Tocci worked as an advisor to Federica Mogherini at the Italian Ministry of Foreign Affairs. Tocci continued to advise Mogherini on foreign policy issues when Mogherini served as EU's foreign policy chief in her capacity as the High Representative of the Union for Foreign Affairs and Security Policy and Vice-President of the European Commission, during the period 2015–2019. She then became an advisor to Josep Borrell when he succeeded Federica Mogherini in those roles.

Tocci has published several books on international relations with a particular focus on European affairs. In 2007, she published The EU and Conflict Resolution: Promoting Peace in the Backyard, in which she used the case of five ethno-religious conflicts on or around the borders of Europe to study the effectiveness of the EU's foreign policy in the area of making or maintaining peace. In 2011, Tocci published a book on America's role in mediating the relationship between Turkey and the EU, called Turkey's European Future: Behind the Scenes of America's Influence on EU-Turkey Relations. She also wrote Framing the EU's Global Strategy in 2017.

In 2008, Tocci received the Anna Lindh Award on European Foreign Policy. In 2015, she became an honorary professor at the University of Tübingen.

Tocci has also been a monthly columnist on global issues for Politico.

Corporate boards
 Eni, Non-Executive Independent Member of the Board of Directors (since 2020)
 Edison, Non-Executive Independent Member of the Board of Directors (2013–2020)

Non-profit organizations
 Centre for European Reform (CER), Member of the Advisory Board
 Círculo de Empresarios, Member of the Advisory Board
 European Policy Centre (EPC), Member of the Governing Council (since 2021) 
 European Council on Foreign Relations (ECFR), Member
 Fondation pour la recherche stratégique (FRS), Member of the Scientific Advisory Board
 Institute for Integrated Transitions (IFIT), Member of the International Advisory Council
 Dahrendorf Forum, Member of the Committee

Editorial boards
 Journal of European Integration, Member of the Editorial Board

Selected works
EU Accession Dynamics and Conflict Resolution: Catalysing Peace Or Consolidating Partition in Cyprus? (2004, Ashgate Publishing)
The EU and Conflict Resolution: Promoting Peace in the Backyard (2007, Routledge)
Turkey's European Future: Behind the Scenes of America's Influence on EU-Turkey Relations (2011, New York University Press)
Framing the EU's Global Strategy (2017, Palgrave Macmillan)

Selected awards
Anna Lindh Award on European Foreign Policy (2008)

References

Living people
Italian political scientists
Women political scientists
Alumni of University College, Oxford
Alumni of the London School of Economics
Academic staff of the European University Institute
Academic staff of the University of Tübingen
Year of birth missing (living people)